Saint John's Tower may refer to:
Saint John's Tower (Vatican City)
Saint John's Tower (Castledermot)
Torre San Giovanni, Ugento